Champeaux may refer to:

People

William of Champeaux, a French philosopher and theologian
Robert de Champeaux, Abbot of Tavistock (1285-1325)
de Champeaux family of Molland, Devon (13th century)

Places in France

Champeaux, Ille-et-Vilaine, Brittany
Champeaux, Manche, Normandy 
Champeaux, Seine-et-Marne, Île-de-France
Champeaux-et-la-Chapelle-Pommier, in the Dordogne département
Champeaux-sur-Sarthe, in the Orne département 
Champeau-en-Morvan, in the Côte-d'Or département